WTCW (920 AM) has been broadcasting in Letcher County, Kentucky, and Wise County, Virginia, since 1953, with a nighttime range just in Letcher County and a daytime range all around Eastern Kentucky and Southwest Virginia. The station has one non-directional antenna, RMS Standard 0.00 mV/m at 1 kilometer and RMS Theoretical 334.70 mV/m at 1 kilometer.

Currently the station's format is classic country. WTCW is owned by Forcht Broadcasting.

External links

TCW
Radio stations established in 1953
Whitesburg, Kentucky
CBS Sports Radio stations
WTCW